Dogs of Hell, originally known as Rottweiler 3-D, also known as Rottweiler and Rottweiler: The Dogs of Hell, is a 1982 horror/thriller film starring Earl Owensby, Bill Gribble and Robert Bloodworth. This was the first of six 3-D films shot by the Ownsby Studios in the early to mid-1980s; it was filmed in the summer/fall of 1981 over the course of two or so months. The film had a wider release in theaters compared to the remaining five Owensby 3-D films.

Plot
The U.S. military has bred and trained Rottweilers, which have escaped, and they are heading for a peaceful community.

External links 
 

Films about dogs
1982 3D films
1982 horror films
1982 films
1982 thriller films
Films directed by Worth Keeter
1980s English-language films